Inkaba tonga is a species of sea snail, a marine gastropod mollusk in the family Trochidae, the top snails.

Distribution
This species occurs in the Indian Ocean off Mozambique.

References

External links
 To World Register of Marine Species
 Herbert D.G. (1992). Revision of the Umboniinae (Mollusca: Prosobranchia: Trochidae) in southern Africa and Mozambique. Annals of the Natal Museum 33(2):379-459
 Herbert D.G. (2015). An annotated catalogue and bibliography of the taxonomy, synonymy and distribution of the Recent Vetigastropoda of South Africa (Mollusca). Zootaxa. 4049(1): 1-98

tonga
Gastropods described in 1992